John Sterland is a Canadian film and television actor.

Sterland was born in 1927 in Winnipeg to English-born parents.

Filmography

Films

Television

References

External links
 

1927 births
2017 deaths
Canadian expatriate male actors in the United States
Canadian people of English descent